Senator Giese may refer to:

Robert Giese (born 1955), Nebraska State Senate
Warren Giese (1924–2013), South Carolina State Senate